Discherodontus ashmeadi, commonly known as the redtail barb, is a fish native to the lower Mekong river basin in Thailand, Cambodia, Vietnam, and Laos. It inhabits both the mainstream Mekong and its tributaries, as well as lakes and reservoirs connected to rivers. It grows to  SL. It is present in mixed fisheries but is not an important fishery species.

References

Cyprinid fish of Asia
Fish described in 1937
Fish of the Mekong Basin
Fish of Cambodia
Fish of Laos
Fish of Thailand
Fish of Vietnam